Nightfall is the second studio album by the Swedish doom metal band Candlemass, released on 9 November 1987 through Axis Records. After being dropped from the label Black Dragon Records, Candlemass were the first band signed to Axis. The group had a new line-up from their previous album including vocalist Messiah Marcolin, whose decisions became instrumental during the production and release stages of the album.

Two singles were released from Nightfall: "Samarithan" and "At the Gallows End". A music video was directed for the song "Bewitched" by Jonas Åkerlund. The album has been re-released in various formats and was followed up by Ancient Dreams in 1988.

Production
After being dropped from Black Dragon Records due to the disappointing sales of their previous album  Epicus Doomicus Metallicus (1986), Candlemass became the first band signed to David Constable's British label Axis Records. Constable had decided to sign the band after being impressed with their demo tape for "Bewitched".

The group's line-up had changed since their previous studio recording. Jan Lindh had replaced drummer Mats Ekström who had left the group because he could not find enough time for rehearsals. Lead guitarist Lars Johansson had also joined the band. During a tour in 1987 with King Diamond, Johansson broke his arm and was temporarily replaced by guitarist Mike Wead. The final new band member was vocalist Messiah Marcolin, who phoned Leif Edling to sing an a cappella version of "Solitude" as an audition.

Like the previous album, Nightfall was recorded at Thunderload Studios in Stockholm with Ragne Wahlquist as engineer. Wead's brief membership in Candlemass lead to him allegedly recording rhythm guitar, harmony and acoustic guitars and keyboards on the album, although the only thing that is confirmed by the band as his is the recording of his song "Black Candles". Marcolin's influence was strong and included the recording of the song "Marche Funèbre" on his suggestion, the band's choice of the album cover based on Thomas Cole's paintings "The Voyage of Life", and the title Nightfall, rejecting Edling's original title for the album Gothic Stone. The song "Samarithan" was originally written during the recording sessions for Epicus Doomicus Metallicus, but was rejected by former group member Mats Ekström.

After completing the sessions at Thunderload, which lasted from July to September 1987, the recordings were mixed by Mats Lindfors at Stockholm Recording Studio.

Release

Nightfall was released on 9 November 1987 by Axis Records on vinyl and compact disc. In 1988, the album was released in the USA by Metal Blade Records. Two singles were released from Nightfall in 1987. The first was for "Samaraithan" which was released on both 7-inch and 12-inch vinyl. Music for Nations and Metal Blade Records released "At the Gallows End" as a 12-inch single in 1988.

A music video was directed by Jonas Åkerlund for the song "Bewitched" in 1988. "Bewitched" was the first music video by Åkerlund, who was previously a member of the Swedish black metal group Bathory. Åkerlund would go on to make music videos for other Swedish bands like Whale and Roxette, as well as international musicians such as Metallica, U2 and Lady Gaga. The music video also featured future Mayhem vocalist Pelle "Dead" Ohlin.

In the 2000s, the album was re-released in Sweden by Powerline Records, including demo tracks, live versions of songs and a music video for the song "Bewitched". In 2007, the album was re-issued by Peaceville Records with similar bonus tracks.

Reception

Like the band's debut album, Nightfall was met with universal acclaim by both music critics and fans. In a contemporary review, Metal Forces editor Bernard Doe called the album "an essential buy for any true metal fan" and lauded Candlemass for mixing "some early Black Sabbath (circa Master of Reality), some early Rainbow (circa Rising) and some Metallica", and adding "plenty of their own original style to produce a unique sound." Rock Hard reviewed positively the album, but recognized that the "sluggish" rhythms and Marcolin's "clean and high voice" could not please everyone.

In a modern review, Metal Storm staff writer remarked the progress made by the band from their debut album in making "more complex and atmosphere/emotion-evoking" music and called Nightfall a "masterpiece." AllMusic's Eduardo Rivadavia review compared the album favorably to the group's previous work, stating that it "managed to break even more new ground by introducing the operatic bellowing of new vocalist Messiah Marcolin, whose religious lyrics found the perfect match in the slow, grinding power chords written by bassist Leif Edling." He found the work "cohesive", despite Candlemass "can't resist thrashing out just a tad" on the songs "At the Gallow's End" and "Dark Are the Veils of Death" Canadian critic Martin Popoff wrote that Nightfall sounds very similar to Candlemass' debut album and its style is a mix of "the slowest portions from Tony Iommi's first five years riffs", Trouble's "sleepiest moments" and St. Vitus' "downer ideas". He added that "a few uptempo ideas would have helped" to raise his score.

Track listings

Personnel

Candlemass
 Messiah Marcolin – vocals
 Lars Johansson – lead guitar
 Mats Björkman – rhythm guitar
 Leif Edling – bass
 Jan Lindh – drums

Additional musicians
Mike Wead – rhythm guitar, acoustic guitar, keyboards

Production
 Candlemass – arranger, producer
 Ragne Wahlqvist – engineer
 Mats Lindfors – mixing
 Thomas Cole – cover art

References

External links
 Music video for "Bewitched" at director Jonas Åkerlund's official website
 

1987 albums
Candlemass (band) albums
Metal Blade Records albums